Pygopus is a genus belonging to the family of Australian legless lizards (Pygopodidae). Members of this genus are also commonly called scaly-foot.

Species
Within the genus Pygopus the following five species are recognized as being valid.

Pygopus lepidopodus  – common scaly-foot
Pygopus nigriceps  – hooded scaly-foot, western scaly-foot, black-headed scaly-foot, western hooded scaly-foot
Pygopus robertsi  – Robert's scaly-foot, Cape York scaly-foot
Pygopus schraderi  –  eastern hooded scaly-foot, eastern scaly-foot
Pygopus steelescotti  – northern hooded scaly-foot

Nota bene: A binomial authority in parentheses indicates that the species was originally described in a genus other than Pygopus.

References

Further reading
Boulenger GA (1885). Catalogue of the Lizards in the British Museum (Natural History). Second Edition. Volume I. Geckonidæ, Eublepharidæ, Uroplatidæ, Pygopodidæ, Agamidæ. London: Trustees of the British Museum (Natural History). (Taylor and Francis, printers). xii + 436 pp. + Plates I-XXXII. (Genus Pygopus, p. 240).
Cogger HG (2014). Reptiles and Amphibians of Australia, Seventh Edition. Clayton, Victoria, Australia: CSIRO Publishing. xxx + 1,033 pp. .
Merrem B (1820). Versuchs eines Systems der Amphibien: Tentamen Systematis Amphibiorum. Marburg: J.C. Krieger. xv + 191 pp. + one plate. (Pygopus, new genus, p. 77). (in German and Latin).
Wilson, Steve; Swan, Gerry (2013). A Complete Guide to Reptiles of Australia, Fourth Edition. Sydney: New Holland Publishers. 522 pp. .

 
Legless lizards
Lizard genera
Pygopodidae
Taxa named by Blasius Merrem